Kirateshwar Mahadev Temple is a Hindu temple, identified to be a Hindu pilgrimage site which is located at Legship, West Sikkim, India along the banks of River Rangeet, which has many episodes of the Mahabharata attached to it. The temple is also known as Kirateshwar Mahadev Thaan by the  Kirati people or simply known as Shiv Mandir.

Main Attraction
The main attraction of the temple are the festival of the Bala Chaturdashi, which is observed in November–December every year and the Shiv Ratri also known as Maha Shivaratri which falls in the month of February or March every year. There are other temples dedicated to Lord Rama and Durga can be found here making it an important pilgrimage destination for Hindus.

Historical background
According to Hindu beliefs, pleased with Arjuna's hard penance and devotion, Lord Shiva appeared before him in the very spot where the temple lies as hunter Kirateshwar or Lord of the Kiratas and blessed him with success in the Mahabharat War. Long time ago as the people found miraculously existed a stone manifesting Shiva Ling. The said Shiv Ling is the main effigy of worship. Belief of many that a mere visit with true devotion to this temple fulfills one's wishes particularly a wish for son or daughter and also wishes for peace harmony and good health.

See also
 Kirata
 Kirata Kingdom
 Kirati people
 Kirat Mundhum

References

External links

Hindu temples in Sikkim
Shiva temples
Gyalshing district
Tourist attractions in Sikkim